3-South is an American adult animated series and sitcom that aired on MTV from November 7, 2002, to January 16, 2003. The show focuses on two lifelong friends, Sanford and Del, and their adventures at the fictional Barder College. With the exception of their roommate Joe, nearly everyone at Barder is stupid and inept. Nonetheless, the idiotic, irresponsible, and thoughtless Sanford and Del are portrayed as the series' heroes, whereas the responsible, intelligent Joe is the de facto villain in most episodes.

The series was created by Family Guy veteran writer Mark Hentemann, loosely based on Mark's college days at Miami University. It is the only animated series produced for MTV by Warner Bros. Animation. Creator Mark Hentemann would later go on to create Bordertown for Fox, which also ran for just one season.

The show's theme song is The Flaming Lips' song "Fight Test" from the album Yoshimi Battles the Pink Robots.

Main characters
 Sanford Reilly – voiced by Brian Dunkleman. Sanford is an obese, oafish, highly insensitive loudmouth who shows little consideration for others. He has a very crude sense of humor, believing in the value of scatophilia and stupid pranks. As Del's best friend, he often takes the lead in their pointless adventures. In Fraternity, he is revealed to be diabetic and has to take insulin for it.
 Del Swanson – voiced by Brian Posehn. Del is Sanford's lifelong friend, similarly stupid, but more reserved and considerate. While Sanford is hopelessly dumb, Del shows a few glimpses of intelligence to his own surprise. He is extremely short and tends to have slightly better luck with women than Sanford ever does. Actor Brian Posehn gives Del a distinct low, droning voice, similar to the one used for Jim Kuback on the short-lived adult animated series Mission Hill.
 Joe Tate – voiced by Mark Hentemann. The most intelligent and miserable student at Barder, Joe is forced to attend Barder College because he was not accepted to Harvard (due to the fact that Harvard filled their quota of white male students). He has dreams of being a physician, but is constantly at odds with idiotic students and the school's poor facilities, including an extremely inept medical center. As Del and Sanford's roommate, he endures their rudeness and stupidity on a daily basis.
 Todd Wolfschmidtmansternowitz – voiced by Brian Posehn. The R.A. of Del and Sanford's floor, Todd is a grotesque loser with a high, croaking voice and several medical conditions, including albinism. Todd has been pathetic his whole life, often mentioning his loud alcoholic father and inability to cope with ordinary problems. He is constantly ignored by the students on his floor despite his good intentions, and has a tendency to blindly follow rules and regulations.
 Ed Bickel – voiced by Mark Hentemann. A hillbilly who lives on Todd's floor. Ed often hangs out with Del and Sanford and displays many stereotypical redneck habits, including a distinctly stupid laugh. Although just as dumb as everyone else, he sometimes provides helpful information and always has a cheerful demeanor.
 Dean Earhart – voiced by Jeffrey Tambor. A Barder graduate, Dean Earheart deals with the school's many failings on a daily basis. He is neurotic, dishonest, and terrible at his job. He has a blonde female assistant named Linda, who serves as his voice-of-reason.
 Felicity – voiced by Lori Alan. Felicity has an over the top obsession over Del since high school, and only enrolled in Barder in hopes to always be with him. Her dorm room is filled with photos of Del all over the place. At one point, Del had to file a restraining order against her only for her to injunct it thinking it was all a misunderstanding. She constantly rips off her own hair to make clothing for Del, in hopes that one day she'll marry Del and bear children with him. She constantly bickers with Sanford.
 Cindy Reilly – voiced by Kathleen Wilhoite. Is Sanford's ditzy, unattractive, alcoholic older sister, who's a junior at Barder. In the first episode, she spent the summer sobering up, only for one of her friends to give her a beer to celebrate, which gets her drunk all over again.  A common running gag in the show is her getting hit by a car, as well as flashing her breasts. She has also been banned from eating in the cafeteria for her antics.
 Dr. Heminger – Barder College's doctor. He is not very helpful when it comes to helping the students on campus, and doesn't seem to know anything about his profession. He also abuses medication.

Episodes

References

External links 

 
 

2002 American television series debuts
2003 American television series endings
2000s American adult animated television series
2000s American college television series
2000s American sitcoms
American adult animated comedy television series
American animated sitcoms
English-language television shows
MTV cartoons
Television series by Warner Bros. Animation
Television series by Warner Bros. Television Studios
Television series created by Mark Hentemann